Apatolestes is a genus of horse flies (family Tabanidae).

Species
The genus contains the following species:
Apatolestes actites Philip & Steffan, 1962
Apatolestes affinis Philip, 1941
Apatolestes aitkeni Philip, 1941
Apatolestes albipilosus Brennan, 1935
Apatolestes ater Brennan, 1935

Apatolestes colei Philip, 1941
Apatolestes comastes Williston, 1885
Apatolestes hinei Brennan, 1935
Apatolestes parkeri Philip, 1941
Apatolestes philipi Pechuman, 1985
Apatolestes rossi Philip, 1950 – (Ross's Apatalestes Tabanid Fly)
Apatolestes villosulus (Bigot, 1892)
Apatolestes willistoni Brennan, 1935
Apatolestes rugosus Middlekauff & Lane, 1976

The following are synonyms of other species:
Apatolestes belkini Philip, 1966 Synonym of Brennania belkini (Philip, 1966)
Apatolestes bekini Philip, 1966(?): Synonym of Brennania belkini (Philip, 1966)
Apatolestes comastes var. fulvipes Philip, 1960: Synonym of A. willistoni Brennan, 1935
Apatolestes comastes var. willistoni Brennan, 1935: Synonym of A. willistoni Brennan, 1935
Apatolestes eiseni Townsend, 1895: Synonym of Zophina eiseni (Townsend, 1895)
Apatolestes lutulentus Hutton, 1901: Synonym of Ectenopsis lutulenta (Hutton, 1901)
Apatolestes similis Brennan, 1935: Synonym of A. villosulus (Bigot, 1892)

References

Tabanidae
Brachycera genera
Taxa named by Samuel Wendell Williston
Diptera of North America